= Qoşaqışlaq =

- Location within Azerbaijan
- Coordinates: 40°25′22″N 50°15′56″E
- Country: Azerbaijan
- City: Baku
- Time zone: UTC+4 (AZT)
  - Summer (DST): UTC+5 (AZT)

Qoşaqışlaq (also, Khardashan, Khardashan, Kishlak, Koshakishlag, and Koshakyshlak) is a village in Baku, Azerbaijan.
